Harry Wood House is a historic home located at Huntington in Suffolk County, New York. It was built about 1853 and is a -story, five-bay, center-entrance plan dwelling with a gable roof and clapboard sheathing.  The entrance features a transom and sidelights with a pent roof and balustraded porch.

It was added to the National Register of Historic Places in 1985.

References

Houses on the National Register of Historic Places in New York (state)
Houses completed in 1853
Houses in Suffolk County, New York
National Register of Historic Places in Huntington (town), New York